Presidential elections were held in Guinea on 9 May 1982. Incumbent Ahmed Sékou Touré was the only candidate (as the country as a one-party state with his Democratic Party of Guinea as the sole legal party at the time), and was re-elected unopposed. Voter turnout was reported to be 98.8%.

Results

References

Guinea
Presidential elections in Guinea
1982 in Guinea
Single-candidate elections
One-party elections
May 1982 events in Africa